WZIS-FM (Z90.7 FM) was formerly WMHD-FM, the student radio station at Rose-Hulman Institute of Technology in Terre Haute, Indiana. The broadcast studio was located on campus in the basement of the Baur-Sames Bogart Residence Hall, while the antenna was located across the Wabash in West Terre Haute, Indiana.

The staff consisted of many dedicated volunteers which include undergraduate and graduate students, as well as faculty and staff.

In 2013, WMHD ceased broadcasting over the air, but continues to stream programming today at http://wmhdradio.org. In 2014, Rose-Hulman sold the broadcast assets of WMHD to Indiana State University. The sale, at a price of $16,465, was consummated on August 15, 2014. Previously, on August 8, 2014, the station changed its call sign to the current WZIS-FM.  WMHD radio is still accessible in an online format today at http://wmhdradio.org.

Programming
WMHD Radio The Monkey is still on the air today at http://wmhdradio.org.  In 2020, nearly 30 Rose-Hulman students have helped make WMHD as vibrant and active as any point in the past decade. The station broadcasts a variety of music and students can produce and put together their own shows.  Categories such as alternative rock, pop, punk, bluegrass, and electronica all in a single broadcast day.

Former logo

References

External links
Indiana State University
WMHD Online Radio, The Monkey

ZIS-FM
ZIS-FM